Agustín "Agus" Medina Delgado (born 8 September 1994) is a Spanish professional footballer who plays for Segunda División club Ponferradina. He previously played for Sabadell, Celta B and Cornellà before joining English club Birmingham City in 2019. He then returned to Cornellà on loan. He plays either as a right back or in central midfield.

Club career
Medina was born in Barberà del Vallès, in the Province of Barcelona in Catalonia. He joined Valencia CF's youth system in 2009, aged 14. In July 2013, he moved to CE Sabadell FC and was assigned to the reserves in the regional leagues.

Medina featured regularly for the B-side, which was promoted to the Tercera División, and signed a new deal with the club, of one year with the option of a further two. On 24 August 2014, he played his first match as a professional, starting in a 2–3 home loss against Real Betis in the Segunda División.

On 3 August 2016, free agent Medina signed a two-year contract with another reserve team, Celta de Vigo B of the Segunda División B. On 14 July 2018, he moved to another third-tier team, UE Cornellà, for the coming season.

Ahead of the 2019–20 season, he signed a two-year contract with Cornellà's sister club, Birmingham City of the English Championship. He made his debut on 6 August in the starting eleven for the EFL Cup first round visit to Portsmouth, partnering Craig Gardner in central midfield as two of the few experienced players in a team that lost 3–0. Four days later, he made his first Football League appearance as a late substitute in a 1–1 draw with Bristol City.

Having made no further first-team appearances, Medina rejoined Cornellà on 15 January 2020 on loan until 30 June. He made nine appearances, scored once, an equaliser at home to Gimnàstic de Tarragona, and was never on the losing side, before football in Spain was suspended because of the COVID-19 pandemic. When it was confirmed that the promotion play-offs would take place, his loan spell was extended to cover the remainder of the season. His goal in the semifinal took Cornellà through to the final, in which they lost 1–0 to CD Castellón so were not promoted.

Medina was twice an unused substitute at the beginning of Birmingham's 2020–21 season, but with several midfielders ahead of him in new head coach Aitor Karanka's pecking order, he rejoined Cornellà on 2 October 2020 on loan for the season. He continued as a first-team regular, and it was his cross, "flicked home expertly" by Adrián Jiménez, that led to Cornellà eliminating La Liga leaders Atlético Madrid from the 2020–21 Copa del Rey. He finished the season with seven goals from 26 league appearances as Cornellà ensured their place in the new third-tier Primera RFEF for the 2021–22 season. Birmingham confirmed that he would be released when his contract expired at the end of the season.

Amid interest from clubs including Burgos CF, UD Ibiza and Deportivo de La Coruña, Medina signed for Segunda División club Ponferradina on 3 July 2021.

Career statistics

References

External links

1994 births
Living people
People from Vallès Occidental
Sportspeople from the Province of Barcelona
Spanish footballers
Footballers from Catalonia
Association football defenders
Association football midfielders
CE Sabadell FC B players
CE Sabadell FC footballers
Celta de Vigo B players
UE Cornellà players
Birmingham City F.C. players
SD Ponferradina players
Segunda División players
Segunda División B players
Tercera División players
English Football League players